Alto Alentejo Province (1936–1976)
 Baixo Alentejo Province (1936–1976)
 Alentejo Region (NUTS 2 region)
 Alto Alentejo Subregion (NUTS 3 region), in Alentejo - Portalegre District + some municipalities
 Baixo Alentejo Subregion (NUTS 3 region), in Alentejo
 Alentejo Litoral Subregion (NUTS 3 region), in Alentejo
 Alentejo Central Subregion (NUTS 3 region), in Alentejo
 Lezíria do Tejo Subregion (NUTS 3 region), in Ribatejo

+
 03